The Downend air crash occurred on 6 November 1957 when a prototype Bristol Britannia aircraft crashed in woods near Overndale Road in Downend, a suburb of Bristol, England, on its landing approach at Filton airport during a test flight. All fifteen on board, four crew and 11 technicians, died in the crash.

Cause
The exact cause of the crash was never determined, but was suspected to be a malfunction of the autopilot, possibly due to faulty wiring. The company which manufactured the autopilot system issued a statement claiming it was not due to the autopilot system, but still altered the system in newer aircraft; the official report states unknown cause but "the autopilot system cannot be ruled out as the likely cause".

Another source cites the cause as "...an instrument failure which ultimately led to a loss of control."

Casualties
All 15 aboard died in the crash. Despite the aircraft coming down in a residential area, nobody on the ground was killed. One woman, a resident of Overndale Road, was taken to hospital after being hurt by the impact blast when one of the engines and part of the wing landed next to her house while she was hanging washing on the line in the garden. 
Another man, who at the time was tiling the roof of a nearby house, broke his arm after falling having been shocked by the aircraft's low flight path.

Memorials

A memorial service was held at Bristol Cathedral on 19 November 1957.

Commemorative events were held on 25th and 34th anniversaries, when the first memorial plaque listing the names of the dead was erected at Downend Folk House. Downend Local History Society holds its meetings in the building, which have one of its rooms named Britannia Room.

A memorial plaque at the crash site, now called Britannia Wood, was unveiled on 3 November 2007 by Beryl Statham, the pilot's widow.

References

External links
 British Pathé - Air News - The Britannia Air Crash - 15 Dead
Picture of crashed aircraft

Aviation accidents and incidents in 1957
1957 disasters in the United Kingdom
1957 in England
Aviation accidents and incidents in England
1950s in Bristol
Accidents and incidents involving the Bristol Britannia
November 1957 events in the United Kingdom